The Eastern Cherokee, Southern Iroquois and United Tribes of South Carolina, Inc. or ECSIUT is a 501(c)(3) nonprofit organization and "state-recognized group and special interest organization," not to be confused with a state-recognized tribe. 

The organization was founded in Columbia, South Carolina, and maintains a presence in Duncan, South Carolina.

The state of South Carolina gave them the state-recognized group and special interest organization designation under the SC Code Section 1-31-40 (A) (7)(10), Statutory Authority Chapter 139 (100-111) on February 17, 2005.

Activities 
For 20 years the ESCIUT hosted an annual Native American film festival in Columbia, South Carolina which gave exposure to Indigenous filmmakers.

The ESCIUT hosts an annual powwow at Hagood Mill Historic Site in Pickens County, South Carolina.

Leadership 
The ECSIUT was formerly headquartered in Richland County, South Carolina and led by the William Moreau Goins, who founded the group and served as chief and CEO up until his passing in November 2017. 

In April of 2020, ECSIUT elected archaeologist Lamar Nelson as their new chief and CEO. Nelson previously served on the board of the ECSIUT. The group is presently headquartered out of Spartanburg, South Carolina and is aiming to bring back the annual the film festival and continue work on other projects.

References

Cultural organizations based in South Carolina
Non-profit organizations based in South Carolina
Unrecognized tribes in the United States